The Mekelle offensive was a military campaign fought between the armed forces of Ethiopia and the Tigray Region to reach the city of Mekelle in the Tigray Region, from 17 November to 28 November 2020. It was part of the Tigray War.

Timeline

17 November 
Mekelle was hit by an airstrike, killing two civilians and injuring several others. The strike also caused damage to roads, bridges and houses. Who carried out the airstrike has been disputed, as the Ethiopian government has denied targeting civilians.

Mortar fire and tank shells also fired upon civilian areas in the town of Shire; hotels, schools, a university campus, an apartment building and the town's own municipal building were hit by the strikes. A number of residents interviewed by Human Rights Watch either stated that Tigayan forces had either left before it occurred, or at the very least, "did not see militia forces present." Both Ethiopian and Eritrean forces were noted as entering Shire later that day.

The Ethiopian government accused the TPLF of blowing up four main bridges leading to Mekelle, which the TPLF denied. By the end of the first day, at least 10 civilians were killed.

18 November 
Ethiopian forces captured Shire and Axum in the morning. Around 9a.m., Ethiopian forces were advancing towards Mekelle by three roads from South, East and Northwest around 200 kilometers away from the city. The Chief of Staff of the Ethiopian Defense Force, Berhanu Jula, announced an intention to encircle Mekelle in order to capture TPLF forces. Fighting between Tigray and Eritrea reportedly took place in Adi Quala, Zalembesa, Taruna, Ali Tina, Wadqomdi, and Badme.

19 November 
TPLF leader Debretsion said that Mekelle was bombed but gave no details of casualties or injuries. Redwan Hussein, a government spokesperson, said that government troops are closing in on Mekelle and had won multiple victories, capturing a number of towns on their campaign towards the Tigray capital.

20 November 
Mekelle was hit by an airstrike which inflicted significant damage on Mekelle University, injuring several civilians. By this point, government-allied forces captured Adwa, while making advances toward Adigrat.

22 November 
Military spokesperson of Ethiopia, Colonel Dejene Tsegaye, announced that Mekelle will be encircled and shelled, telling Tigray civilians to flee the city because Ethiopian forces would show no mercy. TPLF leader Debretsion Gebremichael said that his troops have stalled the Ethiopian forces on southern front.

28 November 

Ethiopian forces begun their direct assault on Mekelle on 28 November. Debretsion claimed that they were bombarding the city with artillery, an accusation rejected by Ethiopian government. Despite this, however, ambulances rushed through the streets picking up dead and wounded after Ethiopian government artillery strikes. Doctors in Mekelle sent text messages on the condition of anonymity to avoid reprisals from the government by using a rare Internet connection in the city. They stated that indiscriminate artillery shelling targeted not only TPLF areas, but also civilian neighborhoods, ended up killing 27 civilians (including a 4-year-old child) and wounded around 100. The hospital staff showed documents to prove their employment and denied any ties to the TPLF, while providing certain pictures of their patients (including infants) having many shrapnel wounds.

The Ethiopian government later that day announced it had taken Mekelle and that it was the end of the Tigray offensive. Debretsion confirmed the TPLF were withdrawing from around Mekelle. Tigrayan forces said they had withdrawn from Mekelle to avoid having the federal forces from further destroying the city and that the TPLF will be fighting in surrounding rural areas, beginning a new guerrilla campaign.

Aftermath
The International Committee of Red Cross which visited Mekelle after the battle, said hospitals were facing difficulties in providing healthcare to patients. 80% of the people at the Ayder Referral Hospital had trauma injuries, causing other services to be suspended. The hospital was also facing a shortage of body bags. Food in the Tigray region had also run out, causing 1,000 Eritrean refugees to request food and other assistance in Mekelle. Analysts have previously stated that the TPLF could switch to insurgency after losing territory.

On 30 November, Ethiopian President Abiy Ahmed told the parliament that federal soldiers have not killed a single civilian during the month-long conflict in the Tigray region, and stated that his army will not destroy Mekelle. However, subsequent reports by both The New York Times and Human Rights Watch report found – after interviewing a number of witnesses – that not only were civilians killed by Ethiopian artillery strikes, but that the strikes "did not appear [to be] aimed at specific military targets," and were instead striking "generalized populated areas."

As of 3 December, electricity had been cut off in the city, which emboldened armed troops (possibly Amhara militiamen) to loot stores at night, forcing many to close.

By 28 June 2021, TPLF rebels recaptured Mekelle as well as bordering Ethiopian villages. The interim government went into  exile and the Ethiopian government declared a ceasefire.

References 

2020 in Ethiopia
Battles in 2020
Battles involving Ethiopia
Mekelle
November 2020 events in Africa
Tigray War